Kyriaki Kouttouki (born 12 September 1996) is a Cypriot taekwondo practitioner. She won the silver medal in the women's 46kg event at the 2017 Summer Universiade held in Taipei, Taiwan.

Career 

She represented Cyprus at the 2013 Mediterranean Games held in Mersin, Turkey and she won one of the bronze medals in the women's 49 kg event. In 2013, she also competed in the women's finweight event at the World Taekwondo Championships held in Puebla, Mexico. In this competition she was eliminated in her second match by Itzel Manjarrez of Mexico.

In 2015, she competed in the women's finweight event at the World Taekwondo Championships held in Chelyabinsk, Russia where she was eliminated in her third match by Iryna Romoldanova of Ukraine. In the same year, she also competed in the women's 49 kg event at the 2015 European Games held in Baku, Azerbaijan where she was eliminated in her first match by Ioanna Koutsou of Greece.

In 2019, she competed in the women's finweight event at the World Taekwondo Championships held in Manchester, United Kingdom. She was eliminated in her first match against Hung Yu-ting of Chinese Taipei. In 2019, she also represented Cyprus at the Summer Universiade in Naples, Italy and she won one of the bronze medals in the women's –49kg event.

In 2021, she competed at the European Olympic Qualification Tournament held in Sofia, Bulgaria hoping to qualify for the 2020 Summer Olympics in Tokyo, Japan. In 2022, she competed in the women's 49 kg event at the Mediterranean Games held in Oran, Algeria. She was eliminated in her first match.

References

External links 
 

Living people
1996 births
Place of birth missing (living people)
Cypriot female taekwondo practitioners
Mediterranean Games medalists in taekwondo
Mediterranean Games bronze medalists for Cyprus
Competitors at the 2013 Mediterranean Games
Competitors at the 2018 Mediterranean Games
Competitors at the 2022 Mediterranean Games
Universiade silver medalists for Cyprus
Universiade bronze medalists for Cyprus
Universiade medalists in taekwondo
Medalists at the 2015 Summer Universiade
Medalists at the 2017 Summer Universiade
Medalists at the 2019 Summer Universiade
Taekwondo practitioners at the 2015 European Games
European Games competitors for Cyprus
21st-century Cypriot women